Chattering teeth, sometimes called chattery teeth, are a wind-up toy invented by Eddy Goldfarb. Originally named "Yakity Yak Talking Teeth", Goldfarb and Marvin Glass sold it to novelty company H. Fishlove & Co. who released it in 1949. Chattering teeth are a pair of mechanized teeth that, after being wound up at the back, clatter together. Reproductions are today sold at novelty stores. While some chattering teeth are equipped with walking feet, many models are not.

Goldfarb's original design was awarded  from the U.S. Patent Office. H. Fishlove & Co., now a division of Fun, Inc. — a manufacturer of magic trick and novelty items — still produces chattering teeth based on Goldfarb's specifications.

Chattering teeth are also commonly seen in toy shops in cartoons.

References

External links
Pressman Toy – Inventor Profile: Eddy Goldfarb (Web archive as of February 19, 2012)

1940s toys
Novelty items
Mechanical toys